Cedar Township, Nebraska may refer to the following places in Nebraska:

Cedar Township, Antelope County, Nebraska
Cedar Township, Buffalo County, Nebraska
Cedar Township, Nance County, Nebraska

See also
Cedar Township (disambiguation)
Nebraska township disambiguation pages